DTV was a television station in Moldova.

External links
 Official Site

Defunct television channels in Moldova
Television channels and stations established in 2006
Television channels and stations disestablished in 2007
2006 establishments in Moldova
2007 disestablishments in Moldova